Take-Two Interactive is an American video game holding company. They have acquired many publishers and developers since the company's foundation in 1993. Today, most of Take-Two Interactive's developers operate as subsidiaries of its publishing arms: 2K and Rockstar Games.

Acquisitions

Notes

References

Take-Two Interactive
Take-Two Interactive